Awantipur Air Force Station  of the Indian Air Force (IAF) is located in Awantipora in Jammu and Kashmir, India.

It is situated near Awantipora at Malangpora about 5 km from Pulwama town.

Facilities
It has one runway with concrete surfaces: 12/30 measuring 10,500 by 150 feet (3,200 by 46 m).

References

Indian Air Force bases
Airports in Jammu and Kashmir